This is list of railway stations in Muzaffargarh District. There is Sher Shah–Kot Addu Branch Line and Kotri–Attock Line in District Muzaffargarh.

List
 Chenab West Bank
 Muzaffargarh
 Thermal Power Station
 Kotla Leghari (Closed)
 Budh
 Mahmud Kot
 Gurmani
 Sanawan
 Kot Addu Junction
 Dera Dinpanah
 Ashanpur
 Hamdaniwala Halt
 Lal Mir Halt
 Lal Pir

External links 

Muzaffargarh
Transport in Muzaffargarh
Buildings and structures in Muzaffargarh
Roads in Muzaffargarh
Lists of railway stations
Muzaffargarh
Muzaffargarh-related lists